La venus maldita (The Damned Venus) is a 1967 Argentine and Mexican erotic drama film directed by Alfredo B. Crevenna.  The film was entirely shot in Peru, mostly in Lima but with location shots in Ancón, Cuzco, and Machu Picchu. La venus maldita was one of thirteen coproductions filmed and shown in Peru between 1962 and 1970.

Cast
Libertad Leblanc
Guillermo Murray
Héctor Godoy
Bertha Moss

Edwin Mayer
Alicia Maguiña

Synopsis
Gustavo Fernández (Héctor Godoy) suffers from an illness which he seeks to keep secret. While he is being treated, he falls in love with Ana (Libertad Leblanc), his nurse, and the pair eventually marry. Following the honeymoon, Gustavo is again bedridden and insists that his best friend, Rafael (Guillermo Murray), and Ana go out and have fun together. His domineering mother (Bertha Moss), and the feelings that develop between Ana and Rafael, threaten Gustavo's long-sought happiness.

References

External links
 

1967 films
1960s Spanish-language films
Argentine musical drama films
Argentine erotic drama films
Films directed by Alfredo B. Crevenna
Films set in Peru
1960s musical drama films
1960s erotic drama films
1967 drama films
1960s Argentine films